January 7 - Eastern Orthodox liturgical calendar - January 9

All fixed commemorations below are observed on January 21 by Eastern Orthodox Churches on the Old Calendar.

For January 8th, Orthodox Churches on the Old Calendar commemorate the Saints listed on December 26.

Feasts
 Afterfeast of the Theophany of Our Lord and Savior Jesus Christ.

Saints
 Prophet Shemaiah (10th century BC)
 Martyr Julian, his wife Basilissa, and with them Martyrs Celsius, his mother Marcianilla, Anastasius, the priest Anthony, seven brothers, and twenty prison guards, of Antinoe in Egypt (283-305)
 Hieromartyr Carterius of Caesarea in Cappadocia (304)
 Saint Elias the Wonderworker, of Egypt (4th century) (See also: January 12 - Greek)
 Hieromartyr Theophilus the Deacon, and Martyr Helladius, in Libya (4th century)
 Saint Atticus of Constantinople, Patriarch (425)
 Saint Domnica the Righteous of Constantinople (c. 474)
 Venerable Agathon of Egypt, monk (5th century)
 Venerable Theodore of Constantinople, founder and abbot of the Monastery of Chora (c. 595)
 Venerable George the Chozebite, Abbot (7th century)
 Saint Cyrus of Constantinople, Patriarch (714)
 Martyr Abo of Tiflis, the Perfumer, of Baghdad, at Tbilisi, Georgia (786)
 Saint Emilian the Confessor, Bishop of Cyzicus (820) (See also August 8 - Greek)
 Saint Gregory of Ochrid, Bishop of Moesia (1012)

Pre-Schism Western saints
 Saint Patiens, venerated as the fourth Bishop of Metz and patron-saint of that city (2nd century)
 Hieromartyr Lucian (priest, the "Apostle of Beauvais"), and martyrs Maximian and Julian, in Beauvais in the north of France (290)
 Saint Eugenian of Autun (Egemoine), Bishop of Autun, a staunch defender of Orthodoxy against Arianism, for which he was martyred (4th century) 
 Saint Severinus of Noricum, monk of Göttweig Abbey (Austria and Bavaria) (482)
 Saint Ergnad (Ercnacta), born in Ulster in Ireland, she was made a nun by St Patrick (5th century)
 Saint Maximus of Pavia, Bishop of Pavia in Italy, he attended Councils in Rome under Pope Symmachus (511)
 Saint Frodobert, a monk at Luxeuil in France, he founded the monastery of Moutier-la-Celle near Troyes, where he led a life of unceasing prayer and asceticism (673)
 Saint Erhard of Regensburg, Bishop of Regensburg (Bavaria) (c. 686)
 Saint Albert of Cashel, English laborer in Ireland and Bavaria (7th century)
 Holy Virgin Gudula (Goule), patroness of Brussels in Belgium (712)
 Saint Pega, an anchoress in the ancient Anglo-Saxon kingdom of Mercia, and the sister of Saint Guthlac (719)
 Saint Garibaldus (Gaubald), first Bishop of Regensburg (762)
 Saint Æthelhelm (Athelm), the first Bishop of Wells, and later Archbishop of Canterbury (926)
 Saint Wulfsige III (Wulsin), a monk whom St Dunstan loved as a son, became Abbot of Westminster in 980, and Bishop of Sherborne in 993 (1002)

Post-Schism Orthodox saints
 Venerable Gregory, Wonderworker of the Kiev Caves (1093)
 Venerable Gregory the Hermit of the Kiev Caves (14th century)
 Venerable Macarius (Makris) of Vatopedi on Mt. Athos and Pantocratoros monastery in Constantinople, Abbot (1430)
 Hieromartyr Priest Isidore and 72 companions at Yuriev (Dorpats) in Estonia, slain by German Catholic Latins in (1472)
 Saint Paisius of Uglich, Igumen of the Protection monastery, near Uglich (1504)
 Venerable Elder Isaiah of Valaam Monastery (1914)

New martyrs and confessors
 New Hieromartyr Victor Usov, Priest (1937)
 New Hieromartyr Demetrius, Priest (1938)
 New Hieromartyr Vladimir, Priest (1938)
 Martyr Michael Novoselov (1938)
 New Hieromartyr Michael Rostov, Priest, confessor, of Yaroslavl-Rostov (1941)

Icon gallery

Notes

References

Sources
 January 8/January 21. Orthodox Calendar (PRAVOSLAVIE.RU).
 January 21 / January 8. HOLY TRINITY RUSSIAN ORTHODOX CHURCH (A parish of the Patriarchate of Moscow).
 January 8. OCA - The Lives of the Saints.
 The Autonomous Orthodox Metropolia of Western Europe and the Americas (ROCOR). St. Hilarion Calendar of Saints for the year of our Lord 2004. St. Hilarion Press (Austin, TX). p. 6.
 January 8. Latin Saints of the Orthodox Patriarchate of Rome.
 The Roman Martyrology. Transl. by the Archbishop of Baltimore. Last Edition, According to the Copy Printed at Rome in 1914. Revised Edition, with the Imprimatur of His Eminence Cardinal Gibbons. Baltimore: John Murphy Company, 1916. pp. 8–9.

 Greek Sources
 Great Synaxaristes:  8 ΙΑΝΟΥΑΡΙΟΥ. ΜΕΓΑΣ ΣΥΝΑΞΑΡΙΣΤΗΣ.
  Συναξαριστής. 8 Ιανουαρίου. ECCLESIA.GR. (H ΕΚΚΛΗΣΙΑ ΤΗΣ ΕΛΛΑΔΟΣ). 

 Russian Sources
  21 января (8 января). Православная Энциклопедия под редакцией Патриарха Московского и всея Руси Кирилла (электронная версия). (Orthodox Encyclopedia - Pravenc.ru).
  8 января (ст.ст.) 21 января 2013 (нов. ст.). Русская Православная Церковь Отдел внешних церковных связей. (DECR).

January in the Eastern Orthodox calendar